Polyprenol reductase (SRD5A3 (gene), DFG10 (gene)) is an enzyme with systematic name . This enzyme catalyses the following chemical reaction

 ditrans, polycis-dolichol + NADP+  ditrans, polycis-polyprenol + NADPH + H+

The reaction occurs in the reverse direction.

See also 
SRD5A3
DFG10

References

External links 
 

EC 1.3.1